Xitieshanite is a hydrous iron sulfate–chloride mineral with chemical formula: Fe3+(SO4)Cl·6(H2O).

It was discovered in 1983 and named for the discovery location of Xitieshan lead/zinc ore deposit in the Qinghai Province, China. It was approved by the IMA in the year of its discovery. The mineral has also been reported in 2005 from acid mine drainage from a coal mine in Green Valley, Vigo County, Indiana.

Properties 
Xitieshanite mainly consists of oxygen (56.14%) and iron (17.82%), but otherwise contains chlorine (11.31%), sulphur (10.23%) and hydrogen (4.50%). This mineral grown in lead-zinc mines, in the oxidation zone of it. Xitieshanite is a pleochroic mineral, which is an optical phenomenon, meaning the mineral appears as if it's changing colors depending on the axis it is being inspected at. On the X axis it appears as it's colorless, while it looks pale yellow if viewed on the Y axis, and light greenish yellow on the Z axis. It doesn't show any radioactive properties whatsoever.

References

Iron(III) minerals
Sulfate minerals
Halide minerals
Monoclinic minerals
Minerals in space group 14